The Bofors 40 mm Automatic Gun L/70, (Bofors 40 mm L/70, Bofors 40 mm/70, Bofors 40/70 and the like), is a multi-purpose autocannon developed by the Swedish arms manufacturer AB Bofors (today BAE Systems Bofors) during the second half of the 1940s as a modern replacement for their extremely successful World War II-era Bofors 40 mm L/60 gun-design. It was initially intended as a dedicated anti-aircraft weapon, being sold as Bofors 40 mm Automatic A.A. Gun L/70, but has since its conception been redeveloped into a dedicated multi-purpose weapon capable of firing both sabot projectiles and programmable ammunition. The Bofors 40 mm L/70 design never achieved the same popularity and historical status as the original L/60 design but has still seen great export and popularity to this day, having been adopted by around 40 different nations and even being accepted as NATO-standard in November 1953. It is still being produced and sold (since March 2005 by BAE Systems AB), and several variants exist for both field and naval applications. A notable variant is the Bofors 40/70B "light armored vehicle variant" which is in use on the Swedish Strf 9040 and Korean K21 infantry fighting vehicles.

The Bofors 40 mm L/70, like most Bofors autocannons, is based on the same core action as the original Bofors 40 mm Automatic Gun L/60, basically being a fire on closing, self-ejecting gun with a recoil-operated autoloader in the same receiver, and thus looks visually similar. Despite this, the Bofors 40 mm L/70 is a separate design with a number of major changes compared to its predecessor. The most superficial changes are the longer L/70 barrel, double cooling vents on the jacket and the fact that the weapon comes chambered for a more powerful 40×365mmR cartridge (vs 40×311mmR for the Bofors 40 mm L/60). Most importantly however is the new ejection system which ejects the empty cartridge cases out from the opposite side to the feed, compared to the ejecting system on the 40 mm L/60 which ejects the cases straight out the back of the gun. This system change almost doubled the mechanical rate of fire from the previous system.

In spite of the Bofors 40 mm L/70 being a separate development to the older Bofors 40 mm L/60-design, the similarities and success between the two guns has caused them both to be widely known simply as "the Bofors" or the "Bofors 40 mm gun", which at times causes the guns to be confused as one and the same weapon.

History 
By the end of World War II, the speed of jet aircraft enabled them to withdraw quickly out of range of the Bofors; a longer range was necessary. A higher rate of fire was also required, increasing the number of rounds fired over the period of an engagement. Bofors considered either updating the 40 mm, or alternatively making a much more powerful 57 mm design. In the end they did both.

The new 40 mm design used a larger 40×365R round firing a slightly lighter 870 g shell at a much higher 1,030 m/s (3,379 fps) muzzle velocity. The rate of fire was increased to 240 rounds per minute (4.0 rounds per second), similar to the German Flak 43. Additionally, the carriage was modified to be power-laid, the power being supplied by a generator placed on the front of the carriage. The first version was produced in 1947, accepted in 1948 as the "40 mm lvakan m/48", and entered Swedish service in 1951. Additional changes over the years have increased the firing rate first to 300 rpm (5.0 rounds per second), and later to 330 rpm (5.5 rps). The introduction of a 40mm proximity fuzed round in the early 1970s was another improvement.

Foreign sales started, as they had in the past, with the Netherlands and the United Kingdom. In November 1953 it was accepted as the NATO standard anti-aircraft gun, and was soon produced in the thousands. The L/70 was also used as the basis for a number of SPAAGs, including the U.S. Army's failed M247 Sergeant York. The UK's RAF Regiment adopted the L70 to replace its L60 guns in 1957, replacing its last examples in 1977 with the Rapier missile system.

In 1970s Zastava Arms acquired from Bofors a license to produce the L/70 together with laser-computer group. Ammunition for the L/70 is produced locally for both domestic and export use by Sloboda Čačak

In 1979 the Royal Netherlands Air Force acquired 25 KL/MSS-6720 Flycatcher radar system and upgraded 75 of their 40L70s to create 25 firing units for static air base defence. The improved guns had an increased rate of fire (300 rounds/min), and the loading mechanism was provided with extended guides so that it could hold 22 cartridges. A 220 volt diesel generator was mounted onto the undercarriage, powered by a Volkswagen diesel engine.

In 1989 the Royal Netherlands Army acquired 30 Flycatcher systems, each fielded with two modified Bofors 40L70G guns (the appended 'G' is for 'gemodificeerd', 'modified'). In the 40L70G version the loading mechanism was further improved and could be recognized by open rear guides. The 40L70G guns were also provided with muzzle velocity radars.

Early in the 1990s the Royal Netherlands Air Force 40L70s were upgraded to the 'G' version.

In the gun-armed versions of the Swedish Army Combat Vehicle 90 a cartridge-fed automatic version of the L/70 autocannon is fitted. In order to fit inside the vehicle, the gun is mounted upside down. New armor piercing and programmable ammunition have also been developed. Germany has used L/70 guns on its Type 352, Type 333 and Type 332 minesweeper vessels, although these will be replaced by Rheinmetall MLG 27 remote-controlled gun systems until 2008. Until the early 1980s L/70 guns guided by D7B radars were in widespread use in the anti-aircraft role in the German Navy and German Air Force, until replaced by Roland SAMs.

The L/70 is also used by the Indian Abhay IFV, which carries 210 APFSDS and high-explosive rounds.  In 2014 Indian Army started upgrading its L/70 guns to modern standards electric  turret drive system and  digital fire control system with thermal imaging cameras, laser range finder, muzzle velocity radar for accurate engagement of targets and has automatic target tracking capability under all weather conditions. The gun has the ability to be integrated with tactical and fire control radars to give more flexibility in its deployment.

The guns has been equipped with ZADS EW suite for detection and suppression of drones between 10–10,000 meters and has the ability to "soft-kill" the drones without using the gun. Upon detecting a drone the ZADS indicates the direction of the approaching drone, then the day and night cameras align themselves towards the target and lock on to it and auto track it, the system then passes the target coordinates on to the L-70 gun through a customised hardware interface. The gun received the coordinates in ‘remote’ mode and aligns itself towards the target allowing the operator to lock on and fire.

Ammunition

Variants 
L/70 BOFI (Bofors Optronic Fire control Instrument) gun system:  Electro optic fire control system (with a computer and laser range finder) and proximity fused ammunition. A "fair weather system".
 L/70 BOFI-R  (All weather):   Multisensor fire control system with a J band radar.  Provides automatic acquisition and tracking with an effective range of 4 km without external radar input.
L/70 REMO (Renovation and Modernisation): Package aimed at extending life span and increasing effectiveness.  Higher rate of fire, new fire control system/air burst programming, and ammunition.
L/70 40mm Netherlands upgrade: New servo system, amplifiers, increased rate of fire (to 300 rds/min), ammo racks, and diesel power unit.
L/70 40mm Spanish upgrade:  Felis electro optic automatic tracking system (HD TV set, automatic tracking, telemetry laser, portable target designator, and radar interface)
AOS 40mm L70 FADM (Field Air Defense Mount): Singapore Technologies electric drive aiming system
TRIDON 40mm L/70: Bofors installed Volvo 725 6x6 truck with fully enclosed, armor protected cab for a crew of five, with only two crew required.  Did not enter service.
LVS 40mm L/70: Equipped with LVS modular fire-control system by Saab.  Entered service with the Swedish Army and Royal Thai Army in 1994 and 1997.

DARDO 

Breda Meccanica Bresciana (now in Oto Melara) of Italy uses the Bofors 40 mm L/70 gun in its anti-aircraft weapon systems Type 64, Type 106, Type 107, Type 564 and Type 520. Also they have developed a CIWS system named DARDO for the Italian Army and Navy. A newer development from Breda, the Fast Forty, employs two modified Bofors 40, each with an improved rate of fire of 450 rpm, as opposed to 240–330 rpm for L/70 version. For naval use, it is normally equipped with a 736-round magazine and a dual feed mechanism.

Image gallery

Users 

 
 
 
 
 
 
 
 
 : 40/70 MkII in Rauma class missile corvettes and Katanpää-class mine countermeasure vessel
 
 
 : Built under license
  Bofors is L/70 built under license.
 
 
 : Former NL guns. Removed from service 2012
 
 : Built under license by Breda.
 
 
 : Several variants
 
 
 : Built under license
 
 
 
 
 
 : 40/70 MkI as 40 mm automatkanon m/48 and 40/70B as 40 mm automatkanon m/70B
 : Built under license
 : 
 : 
 :
 : Defence aid from Lithuania 
 : Built under license
 : Built under license
 : 
 :

See also 
 Bofors 40 mm L/60 gun
 Bofors 57 mm Naval Automatic Gun L/60
 Bofors 57 mm Naval Automatic Gun L/70
 Bofors 75 mm Model 1929
 List of anti-aircraft guns
 List of naval anti-aircraft guns

References

Notes

Sources
 

Naval guns of Sweden
Naval guns of the United States
Naval guns of the United Kingdom
40 mm
40 mm artillery
Aircraft artillery
Vehicle weapons
Anti-aircraft guns of Sweden
Bofors
Autocannon
Weapons and ammunition introduced in 1947